Cherry Box is an unincorporated community in northwestern Shelby County, Missouri, United States. The community is on Missouri Route B 3.5 miles northwest of Leonard. The North Fork of the Salt River flows past two miles to the west of the community.

History
Cherry Box was founded in the 1850s by a colony of German Mennonites. It is uncertain why the name "Cherry Box" was applied to this community, although a few traditions exist. A post office called Cherry Box was established in 1858, and remained in operation until 1943.

References

Populated places in Shelby County, Missouri